Rasabali (IAST: rasābaḷi) is a sweet dish from Odisha, India. Rasabali is offered to Baladevjew, and originated in the Baladevjew Temple of Kendrapara. It is one of the Chapana bhoga of Jagannath temple.

It consists of deep fried flattened reddish brown patties of chhena (farmer cheese) that are soaked in thickened, sweetened milk (rabri). Flattening the chhena into palm-sized patties is done in order to allow them to absorb the milk more readily. The thickened milk is also usually lightly seasoned with crushed cardamoms.

See also

Chhena gaja
Rasagolla
Chhena poda
Khira sagara
Chhena kheeri
Chhena jalebi

References

Cheese dishes
Indian desserts
Odia cuisine